There are Velvet Underground compilation albums with similar titles: The Best of The Velvet Underground: Words and Music of Lou Reed (1989) and The Best of The Velvet Underground: The Millennium Collection (2000).

The Very Best of The Velvet Underground is a compilation album by The Velvet Underground. It was released in Europe on March 31, 2003, by Polydor, the record label that oversees the band's Universal Music Group back catalog.

The album was released following a Hyundai television commercial, which featured the band's 1970 recording "I'm Sticking with You" from the "Fully Loaded" edition of Loaded. The version included in this compilation is from the VU album (1969), despite a sticker's claim to the contrary on the front cover.

Track listing 
All tracks performed by The Velvet Underground except † The Velvet Underground & Nico. All titles written by Lou Reed except as noted.

 "Sweet Jane"
 "I'm Sticking with You" (1969 version)
 "I'm Waiting for the Man"
 "What Goes On"
 "White Light/White Heat"
 "All Tomorrow's Parties"†
 "Pale Blue Eyes"
 "Femme Fatale"†
 "Heroin"
 "Here She Comes Now" (Reed, John Cale, Sterling Morrison)
 "Stephanie Says"
 "Venus in Furs"
 "Beginning to See the Light"
 "I Heard Her Call My Name"
 "Some Kinda Love" (alternate take)
 "I Can't Stand It"
 "Sunday Morning" (Reed, Cale)†
 "Rock & Roll"

Tracks 3, 6, 8–9, 12, & 17 taken from The Velvet Underground & Nico (1967); Tracks 5, 10, 14 taken from White Light/White Heat (1968); Tracks 4, 7, 13, & 15 taken from The Velvet Underground (1969); Tracks 1 & 18 taken from Loaded (1970); Tracks 2, 11, & 16 taken from VU (1985).

Personnel 
The Velvet Underground
 John Cale – viola, bass guitar, keyboards, celesta (3, 5–6, 8–12, 14, 17)
 Sterling Morrison – guitar, bass guitar, backing vocals
 Lou Reed – vocals except as noted, guitar, piano
 Maureen Tucker – percussion (2–17), vocals on "I'm Sticking with You"
 Doug Yule – bass guitar, keyboards, guitar, drums, backing vocals (1–2, 4, 7, 13, 15–16, 18)

Additional musicians
 Nico – lead vocals on "All Tomorrow's Parties" and "Femme Fatale", backing vocals on "Sunday Morning"

Technical staff
 Andy Warhol – producer
 Tom Wilson – producer
 The Velvet Underground – producers
 Geoff Haslam, Shel Kagan and The Velvet Underground – producers

References

2003 greatest hits albums
Albums produced by John Cale
Albums produced by Lou Reed
Albums produced by Tom Wilson (record producer)
The Velvet Underground compilation albums
Polydor Records compilation albums